Melanie Virginia Sydney Morse MacQuarrie (13 June 1945 – 1 February 2005) was a British-born Canadian actress.

Background
MacQuarrie was the daughter of actors Barry Morse and Sydney Sturgess and sister of Hayward Morse. She was born in London, England, but lived in Canada from the age of six. She earned the nickname "Big Mel," having made several newspaper headlines in London as one of the largest babies born in Britain, at 11 pounds, 9 ounces.

Career
She worked professionally as a child actress and later as an adult, when she was sometimes billed by her married name Melanie Morse MacQuarrie. She received a scholarship at the age of 19 to the Royal Academy of Dramatic Art (RADA) in London.

Her film work includes roles in Prom Night (1980) with Jamie Lee Curtis and Leslie Nielsen, as well as Murder by Phone (1982) with Richard Chamberlain. On stage, she performed in such diverse venues as stages in Boston, Massachusetts and the Stratford Festival of Canada, in productions including Peter Pan and Much Ado About Nothing. Her TV appearances include Noises in the Nursery, Drought, and the popular Canadian television series Street Legal.

Death
She died in Montague, Prince Edward Island, from a heart attack. She was 59 years old. She was survived by her husband, Donald, and two daughters, Vanessa Root Archer and Megan MacQuarrie, as well as her father and younger brother.

Filmography

References

External links

Website of Melanie Morse
Website of Sydney Sturgess
Website of Hayward Morse
Official Website of Barry Morse

1945 births
2005 deaths
Alumni of RADA
Canadian film actresses
Actresses from London
English film actresses
English emigrants to Canada